Zhou Jun (born 27 February 1995) is a Chinese weightlifter who competed at the 2012 Summer Olympics in the Women's 53 kg. She failed all her three attempts and was not placed.

She won the bronze medal in the women's 58 kg class at the 2012 Asian Weightlifting Championships.

References

Chinese female weightlifters
Living people
Olympic weightlifters of China
Weightlifters at the 2012 Summer Olympics
Weightlifters from Hubei
People from Yichang
1995 births
20th-century Chinese women
21st-century Chinese women